Ann Olga Koloski-Ostrow (born 1949) is an American archaeologist known for her studies of hydraulic engineering in the ancient world. She works at Brandeis University as a professor of classical studies, the Kevy and Hortense Kaiserman Endowed Chair in the Humanities, and co-director of graduate studies in Ancient Greek and Roman Studies.

Education
Koloski-Ostrow has a bachelor's degree from Upsala College in New Jersey, and a master's degree and Ph.D. from the University of Michigan.

Books
Koloski-Ostrow's books include:
The Archaeology of Sanitation in Roman Italy: Toilets, Sewers, and Water Systems (University of North Carolina Press, 2015)
The Sarno Bath Complex: Architecture in Pompeii's Last Years (L'Erma di Bretschneider, 1990)

She is also an editor of volumes including:
Roman Toilets: Their Archaeology and Cultural History (with Gemma Jansen and Eric Moormann, Peeters, 2011)
Naked Truths: Women, Sexuality, and Gender in Classical Art and Archaeology (with Claire L. Lyons, Routledge, 1997)

References

1949 births
Living people
American archaeologists
American women archaeologists
Upsala College alumni
University of Michigan alumni
Brandeis University faculty